Tanzanapseudidae is a family of crustaceans belonging to the order Tanaidacea.

Genera:
 Acanthapseudes Roman, 1976
 Tanzanapseudes Bacescu, 1975

References

Tanaidacea